The Ruisseau de Pietracorbara is a coastal stream in the department of Haute-Corse, Corsica, France.
It rises in the Monte Stello massif on Cap Corse and flows into the Tyrrhenian Sea on the east of the island.

Course

It crosses the communes of Pietracorbara and Sisco.
The stream rises in the Sisco commune to the northeast of the  Rocher de Pruberzulu and east of the  Cima di e Follicie.
It flows north into the Pietracorbara commune, then east past the village of Pietracorbara to enter the sea at the Marine de Pietracorbara.
The D232 road follows the river from Pietracorbara to the sea.

Bridges
There are three stone bridges over the stream that are said to have been built in the Genoese period (1289–1730).
The Quercetu bridge is in the plain and is the sturdiest of the three.
The Ponticellu, or "little bridge", is at the height of the hamlet of the same name.
The arched bridge adjoins an arched fountain, and is architecturally the most interesting of the three.
The Guadubughju ("dark stream") bridge is at the top of the valley near the hamlet of Selmacce, and spans the stream near the only deep swimming pool on its course.

Tributaries
The following streams (ruisseaux) are tributaries of the Pietracorbara (ordered by length) and sub-tributaries:
 Fiore 
 Faulu 
 Quarcetu 
 Stagnone 
 Olmo 
 Muligna 
 Piscine 
 Acolaja

Notes

Sources

Rivers of Haute-Corse
Rivers of France
Coastal basins of the Tyrrhenian Sea in Corsica